Stamnoctenis morrisata is a species of geometrid moth in the family Geometridae.

The MONA or Hodges number for Stamnoctenis morrisata is 7356.

References

Further reading

External links

 

Stamnodini
Articles created by Qbugbot
Moths described in 1887